Ferrell Haile is an American politician and a Republican member of the Tennessee Senate representing District 18 since January 8, 2013. Haile previously served from his appointment November 22, 2010, to fill the vacancy caused by the resignation of Senator Diane Black until March 8, 2011.

Education
Haile earned his BS in pharmacy from the University of Tennessee.

Elections
2012 With District 18 incumbent Republican Senator Kerry Roberts redistricted to District 25 and leaving the seat open, Haile ran in the four-way August 2, 2012, Republican Primary, winning with 8,627 votes (48.2%), and won the November 6, 2012, General election with 49,472 votes (69.2%) against Democratic nominee Maria Brewer.
2000 To challenge District 18 incumbent Democratic Senator Joann Graves, Haile was unopposed for the August 3, 2000, Republican Primary, winning with 5,216 votes, but lost the three-way November 7, 2000, General election to Senator Graves.

References

External links
Official page at the Tennessee General Assembly

Ferrell Haile at Ballotpedia
Ferrell Haile at OpenSecrets

21st-century American politicians
Living people
Republican Party members of the Tennessee House of Representatives
People from Gallatin, Tennessee
Place of birth missing (living people)
Republican Party Tennessee state senators
University of Tennessee alumni
Year of birth missing (living people)